Amy Sara Broadhurst (born 17 March 1997) is an Irish amateur boxer.  She is the 2022 IBA World Light-welterweight champion, and won the gold medal in the lightweight division at the 2022 Commonwealth Games.

Broadhurst represented Ireland in the light welterweight division at the 2018 AIBA Women's World Boxing Championships. She won the bronze medal in the lightweight division at the 2019 Women's European Amateur Boxing Championships. She won successive gold medals in the lightweight division at the 2018 and 2019 EUBC European U22 Championships.

Media career 
In 2016, Broadhurst and her family competed in the fourth series of the popular RTÉ reality competition, Ireland's Fittest Family. They were mentored by former camogie player, Anna Geary. They were eliminated in the quarterfinals of the competition.

References

Living people
1997 births
Commonwealth Games medallists in boxing
Commonwealth Games gold medallists for Northern Ireland
Irish women boxers
Lightweight boxers
Light-welterweight boxers
People from Dundalk
Sportspeople from County Louth
AIBA Women's World Boxing Championships medalists
Boxers at the 2022 Commonwealth Games
Medallists at the 2022 Commonwealth Games